Anacithara osumiensis is a species of sea snail, a marine gastropod mollusc in the family Horaiclavidae.

R.N. Kilburn disputed in 1994 that Mangilia osumiensis should belong to the genus Anacithara, as it shows features that are unknown in Anacithara, such as two vestigial folds on the inner lip.

Description
The length of the dark white, fusiform shell attains 4.5 mm, its diameter 2 mm. The shell contains 7 whorls and is distinctly spirally striated. The aperture is oblong. The sinus is very short. The wide siphonal canal is curved.

Distribution

This marine species occurs off the coasts of Japan.

References

 Sowerby, G. B. "XXVIII—Descriptions of new species of Mollusca." The Annals and magazine of natural history; zoology, botany 8.12 (1913): p. 234

External links
  Tucker, J.K. 2004 Catalog of recent and fossil turrids (Mollusca: Gastropoda). Zootaxa 682:1-1295.
  Petit, R. E. (2009). George Brettingham Sowerby, I, II & III: their conchological publications and molluscan taxa. Zootaxa. 2189: 1–218

osumiensis
Gastropods described in 1913